Ursavus is an extinct genus of bear that existed in North America, Europe, and Asia during the Miocene period, about 23–5.3 million years ago (Mya), existing for roughly . The genus apparently dispersed from Asia into North America about 20 Mya, becoming the earliest member of the subfamily Ursinae in the New World. Qiu points out that if a questionable 29 million-year-old specimen of Ursavus reported in North America is validated, Ursavus may have evolved in North America and dispersed westward into Asia. The higher number of fossils in Europe grading toward eastern Asia make the westward dispersal unlikely.

U. elmensis, also known as the "dawn bear" is generally taken to be the earliest undisputed bear species.

Description
 
In life, the various species would have been between cat-sized for the smaller species and wolf-sized for the larger members of the genus  and were mainly omnivores or hypocarnivores.

Most other species are known from teeth and skull fragments. A complete skull has been found in the Gansu region of China of a new species from the late Miocene, dubbed U. tedfordi. It was about the size of a wolf and – except for the giant panda and the spectacled bear – is believed to be the nearest to the common ancestor of modern bears.

Currently, the only member known from a complete skeleton is U. orientalis, found in the Shanwang diatomite of Early Miocene China. However, Qiu et.al. (2014) have suggested reassignment of U. orientalis to the genus Ballusia, in which case it would no longer be considered part of Ursavus.

Fossil distribution
A partial list of find sites and specimen ages:
Pawnee Buttes Site, Weld County, Colorado (U. pawniensis) ~23.03–5.3 Ma.
Shanwang diatomite, Shanwang, China (U. orientalis) ~17-16 Ma. May belong to the genus Ballusia 
Pasalar site, Bursa, Turkey (U. primaevus) ~16–13.7 Ma.
Baigneaux-en-Beauc, Alsac, France (U. brevirhinus) ~16.9–16.0 Ma.
Hambach mine horizon 6C, Germany (U. elmensis) ~16.9–13.7 Ma.
Yost Farm Site, Saskatchewan, Canada (U. primaevus) ~16.3–13.6 Ma.
Myers Farm Site, Valentine Formation, Webster County, Nebraska (U. brevirhinus) ~16.3–13.6 Ma.
Lufeng site, Yunnan, China (U. depereti) ~7-6 Ma.
Linxia Basin Gansu, China (U. tedfordi) ~9-7 Ma.

References

Miocene bears
Messinian extinctions
Miocene mammals of North America
Miocene mammals of Asia
Miocene mammals of Europe
Miocene mammals of Africa
Prehistoric carnivoran genera
Aquitanian genus first appearances
Fossil taxa described in 1899